Pseudococytius is a genus of hawkmoths. The single species, Pseudococytius beelzebuth was placed in Cocytius for a long time.

Distribution 
It is found from Nicaragua and Costa Rica south through Venezuela to Brazil, Bolivia and Venezuela.

Description 
The wingspan is 115–148 mm.

Biology 
There are at least two generations per year in Costa Rica with adults on wing from January to February and again from July to August.

The larvae feed on Guatteria diospyroides.

References

Sphingini
Monotypic moth genera
Moths described in 1875
Moths of Central America
Moths of South America